We Do for Córdoba (HPC) is a provincial political coalition in Córdoba Province, Argentina. It was formed in 2019 to support the gubernatorial candidacy of Juan Schiaretti by the Union for Córdoba – another political coalition consisting of, chiefly, the Justicialist Party – as well as the Socialist Party, the Intransigent Party and the GEN Party.

The coalition won the 2019 provincial elections with ease; Schiaretti received 57.38% of the vote and the coalition now holds a qualified majority in the Legislature of Córdoba. Additionally, the coalition counts with representation in the National Congress, with one senator (Carlos Caserio) and four deputies (Cassinerio, Márquez, Vigo and Gutiérrez).

References 

Provincial political parties in Argentina
Córdoba Province, Argentina
Political parties established in 2019
2019 establishments in Argentina
Peronist parties and alliances in Argentina